William Dean Howells House  may refer to:

William Dean Howells House (Cambridge, Massachusetts), listed on the National Register of Historic Places in Cambridge, Massachusetts
William Dean Howells House (Kittery Point, Maine), listed on the National Register of Historic Places in York County, Maine